Tracey O'Connor (born 24 September 1982 in Tokoroa) is a retired New Zealand tennis player. O'Connor is New Zealand Māori, of the Ngāti Raukawa iwi (tribe).

On 8 July 2002, she reached her best singles ranking of world number 417. On 3 December 2001, she peaked at world number 460 in the doubles rankings. O'Connor retired from tennis in 2006.

Playing for New Zealand at the Fed Cup, O'Connor has a win–loss record of 2–2.

ITF finals (0–2)

Doubles (0–2)

Fed Cup participation

Singles

ITF junior results

Singles (2/2)

Doubles (1/1)

References

External links 
 
 

1982 births
Living people
New Zealand female tennis players
Sportspeople from Tokoroa
21st-century New Zealand women